Dwight in Shining Armor is a family fantasy TV show on BYUtv, premiered in America on March 18, 2019. The show features a present-day teenager who awakens a princess from a 1,000-year magical slumber. Season one (spring 2019) and season two (fall 2019) both contain ten episodes. In June 2019 the series was approved for two more seasons of ten episodes. On February 16, 2021, BYUtv announced that season 5 of Dwight, consisting of ten episodes, would be premiered in March and would be the final season.

Plot
Dwight is a present-day teenager who falls into an ancient, underground chamber. He lands on Gretta, a Gothic princess who has been magically sleeping for a thousand years. Dwight inadvertently kisses Gretta, breaking the magic spell.

This action also awakens her court magician, Baldric, as well as scores of medieval villains and makes Dwight her de facto champion until her hordes of enemies are defeated.

Dwight must deal with new role as protector while helping Gretta assimilate into high school life.

Cast and characters
Sloane Morgan Siegel as Dwight, described as a model Generation Z kid: sensitive, open-minded, health-conscious, responsible and non-confrontational. He's not really interested in becoming a rough and tough champion. If he has to do this job, he's going to do it his way.
Caitlin Carmichael as Gretta  who comes from a rough and tough gothic war zone. She has no way of understanding 21st-century manners or political climate and she's not really interested in adapting as all the problems from her world have followed her. She is described as more Wonder Woman than fairy tale princess.
Joel McCrary as Baldric the court magician who placed the spell on Gretta as a last ditch effort to save her life. He is not fond of Dwight as a champion, but is extremely protective of Gretta.
Danielle Bisutti as Witch Hexela. Hexela and Baldric have a complicated past as former lovers. Hexela originally only desires to keep her youth. However, when she reconciles with Baldric and Gretta she decides to join the team to keep Gretta safe. She uses her magic to keep the team out of trouble whenever the most dire situations arrive.
Evan Hofer as Chlodwig. Chlodwig was originally Gretta's fiancé. Eventually the two agree to be friends and he becomes good friends with Dwight. When the situation arrives, he trains Dwight in knighthood, but his clumsiness tends to put the group in more comedic situations than they hope to contend with.

Episodes

Season 1 (2019)

Season 2 (2019)

Season 3 (2020)

Season 4 (2020)

Season 5 (2021)

Production
Seasons 1 and 2 were filmed in Utah. Season 2 was approved before season one aired. Season 3 was moved to Georgia to take advantage of state-offered tax breaks. The episodes are 30 minutes each. As of March 2019, it is one of the most expensive series ever made by BYUtv.

Reception
The New York Times reported that while reaction of a focus group was positive, some parents were concerned that it was a BYUtv production. Parade recommended it as a great option for family viewing.

Release
In the United States, the show appears on BYUtv. International release by Paramount Television

References

BYU TV original programming
2018 American television series debuts
Television series about teenagers